Hezar Jarib (also Romanized as Hezār Jarīb, Hazārjarīb, Hazār Jerīb, and Hezār Jerīb) is a village in Yeylaq Rural District, in the Central District of Buin va Miandasht County, Isfahan Province, Iran. At the 2006 census, its population was 318, in 50 families.

References 

Populated places in Buin va Miandasht County